Sinocyclocheilus qiubeiensis is a species of ray-finned fish in the genus Sinocyclocheilus.

References

External links 
Species at the FishBase

qiubeiensis
Fish described in 2002